Jennifer Kelly Tisdale (born September 18, 1981) is an American actress and singer who is known for her role as Chelsea in the comedy film Bring It On: In It to Win It.

Early life and career
Tisdale was born in Neptune City, New Jersey, the daughter of Lisa ( Morris) and Mike Tisdale, a contractor. She is the older sister of singer and actress Ashley Tisdale. Her father is Christian, and her mother is Jewish; she, along with her sister, were raised with "a little bit of both" religions. Her maternal grandfather is Arnold Morris, and through her grandfather she is also related to businessman Ron Popeil. She was a cheerleader in high school and college. Tisdale went to Cal State Northridge and graduated with a Screenwriting degree.

Tisdale's acting credits include main characters in the movies The Hillside Strangler and Dark Ride. She played Chelsea in the movie Bring It On: In It to Win It and also recorded a track titled "Don't You Think I'm Hot", which can be heard in the film. She also had a role in the MTV series Undressed. Guest star roles include Clubhouse, Raising Dad, Boston Public and others, Tisdale also appeared in her sister Ashley Tisdale's "He Said, She Said" music video in various scenes.

Personal life
She married Shane McChesnie, who manages a restaurant in Los Angeles, in a private ceremony on August 7, 2009 in New Jersey; Ashley Tisdale, her younger sister, was the maid of honor. Tisdale has a daughter, Mikayla Dawn Tisdale (McChesnie). The couple divorced in 2011 after being separated for some time.

Filmography

Film

Television

Discography

Songs

Music videos

References

External links

1981 births
Actresses from New Jersey
American film actresses
California State University, Northridge alumni
American television actresses
Jewish singers
Jewish American actresses
People from Neptune City, New Jersey
Living people
21st-century American Jews
21st-century American women